There is a small community of French people in Korea.

History
French people began coming to Korea as early as the seventeenth century, when French Catholic missionaries first came to the country. However, most missionaries came after the 1886 establishment of relations between France and the Joseon dynasty; the treaty signed between the two countries gave French missionaries the right to evangelise in Korea.

Distribution
There were an estimated 5,343 French nationals in South Korea . Most are employed by French multinationals operating in the country. The largest concentration can be found in the Seorae Village in Seoul's Seocho-gu district, which because of its location on a hill is often compared to Montmartre in Paris. Korea's only school using French as the medium of instruction moved there in 1984. Most French children only attend elementary or middle school in Seoul, but then return to France afterwards.

In September 2009, the Seoul metropolitan government announced a five billion-won plan to renovate the area and make it more attractive to foreign residents by widening pedestrian walkways and putting up more signs in French. One portion of the pavement, starting from the entrance to Bangbae Middle School, is painted in red, white and blue, the colours of the flag of France.

Notable people
Julien Kang, South Korean actor
Siméon-François Berneux, Catholic missionary
Victor Collin de Plancy, French diplomat
Ida Daussy, TV celebrity
Fabien Yves Jerome Corbineau, model and TV celebrity
Robin Deiana, model and TV celebrity

See also

Koreans in France
French campaign against Korea

References

External links
Alliance Française Séoul
French Korean Chamber of Commerce and Industry

European diaspora in Korea
Korea
Korea
Demographics of South Korea